Harzer is a variety of cheese.

Harzer may also refer to:

Harz mountains 
 Harzer Wandernadel, a system of hiking awards
 Harzer Hexenstieg, a footpath

People 
 Jens Harzer (born 1972), German actor
 Paul Harzer (1857–1932), German mathematician and astronomer
 Walter Harzer (1912–1982), military officer